Cleopatra III (c.160–101 BC) was a queen of Egypt. She ruled at first with her mother Cleopatra II and husband Ptolemy VIII from 142 to 131 BC and again from 127 to 116 BC. She then ruled with her sons Ptolemy IX and Ptolemy X from 116 to 101 BC.

Cleopatra III was also known as Cleopatra Euergetis while associated with her husband Ptolemy VIII or her son Ptolemy X. She is attested as  Cleopatra Philometor Soteira while associated with her eldest son Ptolemy IX. According to Strabo, she was sometimes known as Kokke when discussed in relation to her son Ptolemy X.

Life
Cleopatra III's uncle Ptolemy VIII ruled together with her parents from ca 170 BC to 164 BC, at which point he expelled Cleopatra II and Ptolemy VI. However, he was soon forced to abdicate in 163 BC.

Cleopatra III's parents retook the throne and remained in power for almost 20 years until 145 BC. Cleopatra III was born between 160 and 155 BC. She was a sister to Ptolemy Eupator, Cleopatra Thea, Ptolemy VII Neos Philopator, and possibly Berenice.

Ptolemy VI died in 145 BC from injuries sustained when falling from his horse during the battle of Oinoparas against Alexander Balas. Cleopatra III's uncle Ptolemy VIII became the King of Egypt again.

Joint rule with her mother and husband
Ptolemy VIII first married Cleopatra III's mother Cleopatra II in 145 BC, and married Cleopatra III in c. 139 BC.

Cleopatra II rebelled against Ptolemy VIII in c. 132 BC and Cleopatra III fled to Cyprus in 130 BC with her husband, but was able to return to Alexandria in 127 BC. In c. 124 BC Cleopatra III and her husband were joined again by her mother Cleopatra II as a joint ruler.

Joint rule with her sons
After the death of Ptolemy VIII in 116 BC Cleopatra III ruled jointly with her mother Cleopatra II and her son Ptolemy IX. Her mother died late into the same year or early into the next year (115 BC).

Cleopatra III expelled Ptolemy IX from Alexandria in 107 BC and replaced him as co-regent with her second son Ptolemy X. After 6 years of joint rule Ptolemy X had his mother Cleopatra III murdered in 101 BC. Cleopatra III was succeeded by Ptolemy X, possibly in joint rule with his wife Berenice III, who was Cleopatra III's granddaughter.

Issue
Cleopatra III and Ptolemy VIII married in 142 or 141 BC and had five children:

References

2nd-century BC births
101 BC deaths
2nd-century BC Egyptian women
2nd-century BC Pharaohs
2nd-century BC rulers in Africa
2nd-century BC women rulers
Ancient Egyptian queens regnant
Female pharaohs
Murdered royalty
Pharaohs of the Ptolemaic dynasty